Ndu is a town and commune in Donga-Mantung, a division in the Northwest Region of Cameroon. It lies at the northeast edge of the Bamenda Grassfields, on the eastern arc of the Ring Road. It is the highest elevation town in Cameroon.

About 85,000 people live in Ndu commune. Most are Wimbum - the three clans which speak the Limbum language. Ndu commune contains the southeast part of Wimbum-land, including the villages of Talla, Ngarum, Taku, Ntundip, Luh, Ndu-town, Mbipgo, Njimkang, Njilah, Wowo, Sehn, Ntumbaw, Njirong, Ngulu, Nseh Macop, Sinna and Sop. Nkambe Central commune contains the rest of Wimbum-land. Most Wimbum are farmers, raising maize, beans, potatoes, yams, njama-njama, tomatoes, coffee, plantains, and rice. Most soils are rich and the rain is generally sufficient for good crops. At the south end of Ndu commune is the Ndu Tea Estate, the largest tea plantation in Cameroon. Some people raise cattle, horses, goats, sheep, and fowls.

Ndu town is the administrative headquarters of the commune. The town includes a large market, hotels, schools, two hospitals(Government and Baptist Hospitals), a gendarmerie, and the Cameroon Baptist Theological Seminary.

Ndu lies in Cameroon's Western High Plateau. The land is quite hilly, with elevations ranging from 700m on the Mbaw plain, to cool grassy highlands like Talla at 2200m. Important tree species include mahogany, iroko and sapele.
The average weather ranges from 7c to 20c throughout the year

Geography

Climate
The rainfall is abundant, with a short dry season between December and February.

See also
 Nkambé for a very brief history of the area.

References

Bibliography
 
 
 
  Contains a map of the communes in Donga-Mantung.
  (Online map (1973) at page 41.)

Communes of Northwest Region (Cameroon)